British Journal of Special Education is a quarterly peer-reviewed academic journal published by Wiley-Blackwell on behalf of the National Association for Special Educational Needs. The journal was established in 1974 and covers research on special education needs at the pre-school, school, and post-school levels.

External links 
 

English-language journals
Publications established in 1974
Quarterly journals
Special education journals
Wiley-Blackwell academic journals
Academic journals associated with learned and professional societies of the United Kingdom